Count of Montijo is a hereditary title in the Peerage of Spain accompanied by the dignity of Grandee, granted in 1599 by Philip III to Juan Portocarrero, Lord of Montijo, mayordomo mayor and a knight of the Order of Santiago.

Counts of Montijo (1599)

 Juan Portocarrero y Manuel de Villena, 1st Count of Montijo
 Cristóbal Portocarrero y Manuel de Villena, 2nd Count of Montijo
 Cristóbal Portocarrero y Luna, 3rd Count of Montijo
 Cristóbal Portocarrero de Guzmán y Luna, 4th Count of Montijo
 Cristóbal Gregorio Portocarrero y Funes de Villalpando, 5th Count of Montijo
 María Francisca de Sales Portocarrero y Zúñiga, 6th Countess of Montijo
 Eugenio Eulalio Palafox y Portocarrero, 7th Count of Montijo
 Cipriano Palafox y Portocarrero, 8th Count of Montijo
 María Francisca de Sales Portocarrero y Kirkpatrick, 9th Countess of Montijo
 Carlos María Fitz-James Stuart y Portocarrero, 10th Count of Montijo
 Jacobo Fitz-James Stuart y Falcó, 11th Count of Montijo
 Cayetana Fitz-James Stuart y Silva, 12th Countess of Montijo
 Carlos Fitz-James Stuart y Martínez de Irujo, 13th Count of Montijo

See also
List of current Grandees of Spain

References

Grandees of Spain
Counts of Spain
Lists of Spanish nobility
Noble titles created in 1599